The 1937 Santa Clara Broncos football team represented Santa Clara University as an independent during the 1937 college football season. In their second season under head coach Buck Shaw, the Broncos won all nine games, shut out seven, and outscored all opponents by a combined total of  In the final AP Poll released in late November, Santa Clara was ranked ninth, tied with Notre Dame.

The Broncos' victories included a  besting of Stanford, a  victory over Marquette, and a  victory over eighth-ranked LSU in the 

Two Broncos received honors on the 1937 All-Pacific Coast football team: tackle Alvord Wolff (AP-1); and guard Dougherty (INS-1).

Schedule

References

Santa Clara
Santa Clara Broncos football seasons
Sugar Bowl champion seasons
College football undefeated seasons
Santa Clara Broncos football